Karyne Di Marco (born Perkins) (born 14 March 1978 in Whyalla, South Australia) is a female hammer thrower from Australia. Her personal best is 67.44 metres, achieved in March 2004 in Adelaide.

Achievements

References

2006 Commonwealth Games profile

1978 births
Living people
Australian female hammer throwers
Athletes (track and field) at the 1998 Commonwealth Games
Athletes (track and field) at the 2002 Commonwealth Games
Athletes (track and field) at the 2006 Commonwealth Games
Athletes (track and field) at the 2010 Commonwealth Games
Athletes (track and field) at the 2000 Summer Olympics
Olympic athletes of Australia
People from Whyalla
Commonwealth Games bronze medallists for Australia
Commonwealth Games medallists in athletics
Competitors at the 2001 Goodwill Games
21st-century Australian women
Medallists at the 2002 Commonwealth Games